The 2021 F2000 Championship Series season is the eleventh season of the F2000 Championship Series. The sixteen round season began on April 1 at Carolina Motorsports Park, and finished on October 17 at Pittsburgh International Race Complex.

Last year's champion, Brandon Dixon, became a three time champion in the series, and continues to race in this years season.

Drivers and teams

Schedule

Driver Standings

See also
F2000 Championship Series

References

F2000 Championship Series seasons
F2000